Vishnevka is a rural locality (a village) in Ibragimovsky Selsoviet, Chishminsky District, Bashkortostan, Russia. The population was 73 as of 2010. There is 1 dirt road.

Geography 
Vishnevka is located 40 km southeast of Chishmy (the district's administrative centre) by road. Repyevka is the nearest rural locality.

References 

Rural localities in Chishminsky District